Dr. Zoran T. Popovski is a Macedonian scientist and professor working at the Institute of Animal Biotechnology under the Faculty of Agricultural Sciences and Food in the Ss. Cyril and Methodius University, Skopje, Republic of Macedonia.
He is a specialist in molecular biology in animal science, genetic engineering and GMO. He has been working for the faculty since 1992.

In the period 2002-2006 he worked as a State Secretary in the Ministry of Education and Science of the Republic of Macedonia. In this role he was a member of the National Expert Group and worked on Education Strategy.
He also represented Macedonian Science and Technology within the western Balkans EU region.

Popovski's last publication discussed polymorphism in the genome of indigenous Macedonian and Slovenian sheep breeds.

Selected publications

References

Scientists from Skopje
Living people
1962 births
Academic staff of the Ss. Cyril and Methodius University of Skopje